Siedlęcin Tower is the 14th-century tower castle situated in the southwestern Polish village of Siedlęcin, (Boberröhrsdorf) in the Karkonosze County.

The keep in Siedlęcin is one of the best-preserved examples of such buildings in Central Europe; its construction was probably started in 1313 or 1314 by Henry I of Jawor. He and his wife Agnes of Bohemia also commissioned the medieval Gothic fresco murals depicting the legend of Lancelot that are painted in the great hall of the keep.

The tower, surrounded by a moat, is a keep of a relatively modest sort, which combines the functions of housing, ceremony, and defence in a vertical disposition analogous to those found in other castles in Europe: the lower storeys were designed for defence and for trade and business; the upper floors consisted of living quarters, and fulfilled the ceremonial functions of the dukes; the topmost floor also served defensive purposes.

References

External links 

History and photos of the Ducal Tower in Siedlęcin 

Castles in Lower Silesian Voivodeship
Karkonosze County
Tower houses